Simeon Rusev (Bulgarian: Симеон Русев; born 26 August 1998) is a Bulgarian footballer who plays as a midfielder for FC Yambol.

Career

Neftochimic
On 11 May 2017 he made his debut for Neftochimic Burgas in First Professional Football League against Beroe Stara Zagora.
He played 81 minutes and left great impressions.

Botev Galabovo
In June 2018, Rusev joined Botev Galabovo.

Career statistics

Club

References

External links
 

1998 births
Living people
People from Yambol
Bulgarian footballers
Association football midfielders
Neftochimic Burgas players
FC Botev Galabovo players
PFC Nesebar players
FC Kariana Erden players
First Professional Football League (Bulgaria) players
Second Professional Football League (Bulgaria) players